Cristóbal Lloréns was a Spanish painter, active during the late-Renaissance period. He lived in Valencia about 1597. He painted a history of St. Mary Magdalene and St. Sebastian (now lost) for the conventual church of San Miguel de his Reyes.

References

Painters from the Valencian Community
Spanish Renaissance painters
16th-century Spanish painters
Spanish male painters
17th-century Spanish painters
Year of death unknown
Year of birth unknown